Ungmennafélag Kjalnesinga, commonly known as UMFK, is an Icelandic multi-sports club based in Kjalarnes, Reykjavík, in the capital area of Iceland. The club fields departments in athletics, basketball, football, and swimming.

Basketball

The club fields junior teams and a senior women's team. The clubs girls junior teams where featured in the 2021 documentary Raise the bar.

Women's basketball
The club fields a women's basketball team, named Aþena-UMFK, that plays in the second-tier 1. deild kvenna and the Icelandic Cup. After initially being allowed to play their home games at the Álftanes stadium for the 2021-2022 season, the team was denied its use by Garðabær officials at the behest of rival club Stjarnan. The team later received and accepted an offer from Akranes to play their games at Vesturgata.

Notable players

Coaches
  Brynjar Karl Sigurðsson 2021–present

References

1938 establishments in Iceland
Basketball teams in Iceland
Football clubs in Iceland
Multi-sport clubs in Iceland